Keralasseri (also spelt Keralassery) is a Grama Panchayat and a Village near Pathirippala , Palakkad district, Kerala, India. Keralasseri is a small village consisting of temples, mosques and churches.

Demographics
 India census, Keralasseri had a population of 14,755 with 6,972 males and 7.783 females.

Places of worship
Kallapadi Shiva Temple (the temple with two deities Shiva and Vishnu with equal importance)
Kootala bhagavathy Temple: Pattu at Koottala Bagavathi Temple is famous. April May is a festival season here.,Kovilkattu Panikkers, Madathil Pottayil and Madathil Padinjakkara were the famous families here before independence. Panikker Veedu, Madathil Puthanveed, Madathil Oravil and Chundayil Kalam are the Nair families here.
Sri Kurumba Kavu
Karadimala Bhagavathy Temple
Ayanari Ayyappa Temple: Ayanari Ayyappa temple is known for rare Bala Dharmasasthra idol.
Yakkikav Durga Devi Temple 
St.Mary's Church
Keralassery Mosque.

Places of Education
Higher Secondary School Keralassery
A.U.P School Keralassery
Thadukkasseri Holly Family AUP School, Keralassery
NEUP School Keralassery

References 

Villages in Palakkad district
Gram panchayats in Palakkad district